London Bridge terror attack may refer to:
 2017 London Bridge attack
 2019 London Bridge stabbing